Chilamathur is a village in Sri Sathya Sai district of Andhra Pradesh in India.

Demographics 

 census, the village had a population of 15,449. The total population constitutes 7,786 males and 7,663 females —a sex ratio of 984 females per 1000 males. 1,706 children are in the age group of 0–6 years, of which 852 are boys and 854 are girls —a ratio of 1002 per 1000. The average literacy rate stands at 67.37% with 9,258 literates, significantly higher than the state average of 67.41%.

References 

Villages in Sri Sathya Sai district
Mandal headquarters in Sri Sathya Sai district